Don't Get Personal is a 1942 American romantic musical film directed by Charles Lamont and starring Jane Frazee.

Cast
 Hugh Herbert - Elmer Whippet / Oscar Whippet
 Mischa Auer - Stainslaus Noodnick  Charlie
 Jane Frazee - Mary Reynolds
 Anne Gwynne - Susan Blair
 Robert Paige - Paul Stevens
 Ernest Truex - Jules Kinsey
 Andrew Tombes - James M. Snow
 Sterling Holloway - Lucky
 Richard Davies - John Stowe
 Ray Walker - Pitchman

External links
 
 

1942 films
1942 musical comedy films
1942 romantic comedy films
American musical comedy films
American romantic comedy films
American romantic musical films
American screwball comedy films
American black-and-white films
Films scored by Franz Waxman
Films directed by Charles Lamont
Films set in New York City
Universal Pictures films
1940s romantic musical films
1940s English-language films
1940s American films